Dariusz Trafas (born 16 May 1972 in Kolobrzeg) is a former Polish javelin thrower.

He won the silver medal at the 1990 World Junior Championships, finished tenth at the 2000 Summer Olympics and seventh at the 2002 European Championships. He competed at the World Championships in 1999 and 2001 without reaching the final.

His personal best was 87.17 metres, achieved in September 2000 in Runaway Bay.

He was coached by former world record holder Uwe Hohn.

Seasonal bests by year
1998 - 81.90
1999 - 83.23
2000 - 87.17
2001 - 85.78
2002 - 86.77
2003 - 81.98
2004 - 80.78
2005 - 77.55
2006 - 77.57

Competition record

See also
Polish records in athletics

External links

1972 births
Living people
Polish male javelin throwers
Athletes (track and field) at the 2000 Summer Olympics
Olympic athletes of Poland
People from Kołobrzeg
Sportspeople from West Pomeranian Voivodeship